The Bomb Squad were an American hip hop production team known for its work with hip hop group Public Enemy.

The Bomb Squad is noted for its dense, distinct, innovative  production style, often utilizing dozens of samples on just one track. They are also known for incorporating harsh, atonal sounds and samples into their productions. About.com ranked the Bomb Squad #12 on its Top-50 Hip-Hop Producers list.

Members 
Hank Shocklee
Keith Shocklee
Chuck D (Credited as Carl Ryder); also member of Public Enemy
Eric "Vietnam" Sadler
Gary G-Wiz (Gary Rinaldo)
Bill Stephney (former member)

Partial discography 
Public Enemy – Yo! Bum Rush the Show
True Mathematics and the Invisible Empire – After Dark
Kings of Pressure – 'Armed and Dangerous'
Kings of Pressure – 'Give Me the Mike (Is This the End)' / 'You Know How to Reach Us'
Robert S. – 'Good as Gold' / 'Big Words'
Public Enemy – It Takes a Nation of Millions to Hold Us Back
Doug E. Fresh and the Get Fresh Crew – The Worlds Greatest Entertainer ('On The Strength' and 'Keep Risin' to the Top')
True Mathematics – 'For the Money' / 'K.A.O.S.S. (Greeks in Effect pt. 2)'
The 7A3 – 'Coolin' in Cali'
Vanessa Williams – 'The Right Stuff'
Slick Rick – The Great Adventures of Slick Rick
Ziggy Marley and the Melody Makers – 'Tumblin' Down' Remix
LL Cool J – Walking with a Panther ('It Gets No Rougher' and 'Nitro')
3rd Bass – The Cactus Album ('Steppin' to the AM' and 'Oval Office')
Peter Gabriel – Steam (Single – Oh Oh Let Off Steam Mix)
True Mathematics – 'I Don't Love You Anymore'
The Stop The Violence Movement – 'Self Destruction'
Alyson Williams – 'Sleep Talk'
Paul Jackson Jr. – Out of the Shadows ('My Thing' and 'The New Jazz Swing')
Bell Biv Devoe – Poison
Public Enemy – Fear of a Black Planet
Ice Cube – AmeriKKKa's Most Wanted
Young Black Teenagers – Young Black Teenagers
Manic Street Preachers – 'Repeat (Stars and Stripes)' from the album Generation Terrorists
Leaders of the New School – A Future Without a Past... ('Just When You Thought It Was Safe...', 'Sobb Story' and 'Trains, Planes and Automobiles')
Public Enemy – Apocalypse 91... The Enemy Strikes Black
Terminator X – Terminator X and the Valley of the Jeep Beats
Bell Biv Devoe – WBBD-Bootcity!: The Remix Album ('Ain't Nuttin' Changed!', 'B.B.D. (I Thought It Was Me?)' and 'Let Me Know Something ?!')
Son of Bazerk – Bazerk Bazerk Bazerk
Salt-N-Pepa – 'He's Gamin' on Ya'
Big Daddy Kane – 'Nuff Respect'
Eric B. & Rakim – 'Juice (Know the Ledge)'
Aaron Hall – 'Don't be Afraid'
Public Enemy – Greatest Misses
Chilly Tee – Get Off Mine
Run–D.M.C. – Down with the King ('3 in the Head' and 'Ooh, Whatcha Gonna Do')
Terminator X & the Godfathers of Threatt – It All Comes Down to the Money
Public Enemy – Muse Sick-N-Hour Mess Age
Public Enemy – He Got Game soundtrack

References

External links 
Public Enemy official website

American hip hop record producers
East Coast hip hop groups
Musical groups from Long Island
Public Enemy (band)
Record production teams